Xanthe (Greek: Ξανθή, meaning "blond-haired") is a name with origins in Greek mythology. People with this first name include:
 
Xanthe Elbrick  (born 1978), British actress
Xanthe Huynh, American actress 
Xanthé Mallett, British anthropologist and criminologist
In Greek mythology:
One of the Oceanids (sea nymphs), daughters of Oceanus and Tethys
One of the Amazons
The wife of Asclepius is sometimes called Xanthe

It may also refer to:
411 Xanthe, main belt asteroid
Xanthe Canning, a fictional character from the Australian soap opera Neighbours
Xanthe Montes, mountain range on the planet Mars
Xanthe Terra, a region on Mars

See also
Xanthi

Naiads
Amazons (Greek mythology)